Edward Southwell Ruthven (c. 1772 – 31 March 1836) was an Irish Repealer politician and member of the United Kingdom Parliament.

He was a Member for Downpatrick 1806-7 and 1830–1832, MP for Dublin City (Repealer) 1832–1835 and (Liberal Repealer) January 1835 – 13 April 1835 (when he was unseated on petition).

His daughter Elizabeth married Reverend Francis Stainforth. His son, Edward Ruthven, was MP for Kildare, 1832–1837.

External links
Who's Who of British Members of Parliament, Volume I 1832 – 1885 edited by M. Stenton (The Harvester Press 1976)
Parliamentary Election Results in Ireland, 1801 – 1922 edited by B.M. Walker (Royal Irish Academy 1978).

1772 births
1836 deaths
Members of the Parliament of the United Kingdom for County Down constituencies (1801–1922)

Members of the Parliament of the United Kingdom for County Dublin constituencies (1801–1922)
UK MPs 1830–1831
UK MPs 1831–1832
UK MPs 1832–1835
UK MPs 1835–1837
Irish Repeal Association MPs